Hibbertia hirta is a species of flowering plant in the family Dilleniaceae and is endemic to the Budawang Range in New South Wales. It is a shrub with hairy foliage, narrow elliptic to narrow lance-shaped leaves, and yellow flowers with eleven or twelve stamens arranged in a cluster on one side of the two carpels.

Description 
There are eleven or twelve stamens arranged in a single cluster on one side of the two carpels, each carpel with two ovules.

Taxonomy 
Hibbertia hirta was first formally described in 1998 by Hellmut R. Toelken in the Journal of the Adelaide Botanic Gardens from specimens collected in 1971. The specific epithet (hirta) means "hairy", referring to the fine spreading hairs on most of the plant.

Distribution and habitat 
This hibbertia grows in association with sandstone or conglomerate in the Budawang Range, Morton National Park.

See also 
 List of Hibbertia species

References 

hirta
Flora of New South Wales
Plants described in 1998
Taxa named by Hellmut R. Toelken